"Go Hard (La.La.La)" is a single by American hip hop recording artist Kreayshawn. Released on July 24, 2012, it was the third single from Kreayshawn's debut studio album, Somethin' 'Bout Kreay (2012).

Critical reception
"Go Hard (La.La.La)" has received mixed reviews. Spin magazine's Marc Hogan criticized Kreayshawn for abandoning her traditional hip hop style for the conventional electropop themes heard on the radio. Continuing in his negative review, Hogan went on to call the spoken-word intro and the pre-chorus of the song "ridiculous", and "not in the good way". In a review of Somethin' 'Bout Kreay, Siân Rowe of NME gave "Go Hard (La.La.La)" a positive review, comparing Kreayshawn's aesthetic in the song to that of Katy Perry's, stating "The Katy Perry thing works fine when upbeat (like on ‘Go Hard (La. La. La)'". Adam Bychawski of Drowned in Sound, dubbed certain tracks from Somethin' 'Bout Kreay, including "Go Hard (La.La.La)", a "preponderance of bland dance tracks".

Music video 
The song's music video was directed by production crew Syndrome.

Charts 
"Go Hard (La.La.La)" spent five weeks on the U.S. Rhythmic Songs chart, peaking at number 29, on the week of October 6, 2012. The song also spent 4 weeks on the Belgium Ultratip Bubbling Under chart in Flanders, peaking at number 58 on September 22, 2012.

Weekly charts

Release history

References

2012 singles
Kreayshawn songs
Columbia Records singles
Songs written by Jean-Baptiste (songwriter)
Songs written by Ryan Buendia
Songs written by Jonas Jeberg
Songs written by Michael McHenry
2012 songs